Wicked Witch is a name for:

 The hag, a stock character in fairy tales
 The Wicked Witch of the West, the main antagonist in L. Frank Baum's book The Wonderful Wizard of Oz as well as Metro-Goldwyn-Mayer's 1939 film adaptation
 The Wicked Witch of the West (Once Upon a Time) (known by the name Zelena), is a character from the ABC television series Once Upon a Time

It may also refer to:
 "Wicked Witch", a song by Nardo Wick from the album Who Is Nardo Wick? (2021)
 "Wicked Witch", a song by Lovebites from the album Judgement Day (2023)
Wicked Witch Software, a video game developer

Other characters in the fictional land of Oz:
Wicked Witch of the East
Wicked Witch of the North, also known as Mombi
Wicked Witch of the South

See also
Wykked Wytch
Wicked (disambiguation)
Good witch (disambiguation)